Alfonso Cela Vieito, known as Celita (July 11, 1885 – February 26, 1932), was a Spanish-Galician bullfighter. He is the only Galician to ever become a professional bullfighter.

Biography 
Celita was born in Carracedo, a small village in Láncara, Galicia, a region in the northwest of Spain. He moved to Madrid after the death of his father in 1896.

He began his career as a novillero (a bullfighter who only faces calves) in 1906 and took his alternativa (ceremony in which novilleros graduate to matador) in the bullfighting ring of A Coruña on 15 September 1912.

His brother Claudio and nephew Alfonso Cela Martín (known as Cela II) were bullfighters as well but never reached professional level.

See also
 List of bullfighters

References 

1885 births
1932 deaths
Spanish bullfighters
People from Sarria (comarca)
Sportspeople from the Province of Lugo